Troyes is a commune and the capital of the department of Aube in the Grand Est region of north-central France. Troyes is situated within the Champagne wine region and is near to the Orient Forest Regional Natural Park.

Troyes had a population of 61,996 inhabitants in 2018. It is the center of the agglomeration community Troyes Champagne Métropole, which was home to 170,145 inhabitants. 

Troyes developed as early as the Roman era, when it was known as Augustobona Tricassium. It stood at the hub of numerous highways, primarily the Via Agrippa. The city has a rich historical past, from the Tricasses tribe to the liberation of the city on 25 August 1944 during the Second World War, including the Battle of the Catalaunian Plains, the Council of Troyes, the marriage of Henry V and Catherine of France, and the Champagne fairs to which merchants came from all over Christendom. The city has a rich architectural and urban heritage: many buildings are protected as historical monuments, including the half-timbered houses (mainly of the 16th century) that survived in the old town. They have contributed to Troyes being designated as a City of Art and History. 

Manufacturing of textiles, developed from the 18th century onwards, was a chief part of Troyes' economy until the 1960s. Today, Troyes is the European capital of factory outlets and trading, and has three brand centers.

History

Prehistoric evidence has been found in the Troyes area, suggesting that the settlement may have developed as early as 600 BC. Celtic grave-mounds have been found near the city, and Celtic artifacts have been excavated within the City grounds.

In the Roman era, it was known as Augustobona Tricassium. Numerous highways intersected here, primarily the Via Agrippa, which led north to Reims and south to Langres, and eventually to Milan. Other Roman routes from Troyes led to Poitiers, Autun and Orléans. 

It was the civitas of the Tricasses people, who had been separated by Augustus from the Senones. Of the Gallo-Roman city of the early Empire, some scattered remains have been found, but no public monuments, other than traces of an aqueduct. By the Late Empire the settlement was reduced in extent. It was referred to as Tricassium or Tricassae, the origin of French Troyes.

From the fourth century AD, the people had become Christian and the city was designated as the seat of a bishop. The legend of its bishop Lupus (Loup), who saved the city from Attila by offering himself as hostage, is hagiographic rather than historical. It was several centuries before Troyes gained importance as a medieval centre of commerce.

The Battle of the Catalaunian Plains, also called The Battle of Troyes, was fought nearby in 451 AD, between the Roman general Flavius Aetius and the Visigothic king Theodoric I against Attila.

The early cathedral occupied the site of the current one. Here Louis the Stammerer in 878 received the imperial crown from Pope John VIII. At the end of the ninth century, following depredations to the city by Normans, the counts of Champagne chose Troyes as their capital. It remained the capital of the Province of Champagne until the Revolution of the late eighteenth century. The Abbey of Saint-Loup developed a renowned library and scriptorium.

During the Middle Ages, Troyes was an important international trading town. It was the namesake of troy weight for gold a standard of measurement developed here. The Champagne cloth fairs and the revival of long-distance trade, together with new extension of coinage and credit, were the drivers of the medieval economy of Troyes.

In 1285, when Philip the Fair united Champagne to the royal domain, the town kept a number of its traditional privileges. John the Fearless, Duke of Burgundy and ally of the English, in 1417 worked to have Troyes designated as the capital of France. He came to an understanding with Isabeau of Bavaria, wife of Charles VI of France, that a court, council, and parlement with comptroller's offices should be established at Troyes. 

On 21 May 1420, the Treaty of Troyes was signed in this city, still under control of the Burgundians, by which Henry V of England was betrothed to Catherine, daughter of Charles VI. Under the terms of the treaty, Henry V was to succeed Charles, to the detriment of the Dauphin. The high-water mark of Plantagenet hegemony in France was reversed when the Dauphin, afterwards Charles VII, and Joan of Arc recovered the town of Troyes in 1429 for French control by armed conflict (Siege of Troyes).

The great fire of 1524 destroyed much of the medieval city, although the city had numerous canals separating sections.

Main sights

 Many half-timbered houses (mainly of the 16th century) survive in the old town.
 Hôtels Particuliers (palaces) of the old town
 The Hôtel de Ville, Place Alexandre Israël, is an urbane example of the style Louis XIII. On the central corps de logis, which contains the main reception rooms, its cornice is rhythmically broken forward over paired Corinthian columns; these are supported below by strong clustered pilasters. Above the entrance door the statue of Louis XIV was pulled out of its niche and smashed in 1793, during the Reign of Terror at the height of the French Revolution; it was replaced in the nineteenth century with the present Helmeted Minerva and the device in its original form. It is now rare to see "Liberté, Egalité, Fraternité, ou la Mort". In the Salle du Conseil (Council Chamber) a marble medallion of Louis XIV (1690) by François Girardon, born at Troyes, survived the destruction unscathed.

Museums
 Museum of Modern Art (Musée d'Art Moderne)
 Maison de l'outil et de la pensée ouvrière
 Vauluisant Museum :
 Historical museum of Troyes and Champagne-Ardenne
 Museum of hosiery
 Hôtel-Dieu-Lecomte apothecary
 Saint-Loup Museum (museum of fine arts)
 Di Marco Museum (Open from 1 April to 1 October, each year)

Churches

Not having suffered from the last wars, Troyes has a high density of old religious buildings grouped close to the city centre. They include:
 Saint-Pierre-et-Saint-Paul Cathedral
 Saint-Nizier Church, in Gothic and Renaissance style, with remarkable sculptures. Classified as a Monument Historique (French equivalence) in 1840.
 The Gothic Saint-Urbain Basilica (thirteenth century), with a roofing covered by polished tiles. It was built by Jacques Pantaléon, who was elected pope in 1261, under the name of Urbain IV, on grounds where his father had a workshop. Classified Monument Historique in 1840. It was proclaimed a basilica in 1964. 
 Sainte-Madeleine Church. Very early Gothic, with east end rebuilt around 1500. Remarkably elaborate stone rood screen of 1508-17 in Flamboyant Gothic style, sculpted by Jean Gailde, with a statue of Saint Martha. Fine Renaissance stained glass. Saint Jean district. Classified Monument historique in 1840.
 Saint-Jean Church, with a Renaissance chancel, tabernacle of the high altar by Giraudon. On the portal, coat of arms of Charles IX. Classified Monument Historique in 1840.
 Gothic Saint-Nicolas Church, dating to the beginning of the sixteenth century, with a calvary chapel -shaped rostrum reached by a monumental staircase. On the south portal, two sculptures by François Gentil of David and Isaiah.
 Saint-Pantaléon Church, with extensive statuary from the sixteenth century.
A 17th-century sundial on its south side bears the Latin inscription sicut umbra dies nostri super terram ("our days on earth pass like a shadow").
 Church of Saint-Martin-ès-Vignes. It has stained glass windows of the seventeenth century by the local master verrier Linard Gonthier.

Several Troyes churches have sculpture by The Maître de Chaource.

Climate

Population
The inhabitants of the commune are called Troyens.

Economy

Troyes is home to the production headquarters of Lacoste company, a popular clothing brand. It is also home of prize-winning chocolatier Pascal Caffet.

Education
Troyes welcomes the University of Technology of Troyes and the business school Groupe École supérieure de commerce de Troyes.

Transport
The train station Gare de Troyes offers connections to Paris, Dijon, Mulhouse and several regional destinations. Troyes is at the junction of motorways A5 (Paris – Troyes – Langres) and A26 (Calais – Reims – Troyes). Troyes – Barberey Airport is a small regional airport.

Sport
Troyes is the home of association football club Troyes AC, or ESTAC. In the 2020–21 Ligue 2 season, Troyes were promoted back to Ligue 1 as champions of the division.

In popular culture
 Troyes (2010) is a board game named after the city, published by Pearl Games, UPlay.it edizioni, and Z-Man Games.
 Chapter 28 of James Rollins' sixth Sigma Force novel, The Doomsday Key (2009), is named "Troyes, France," as the city plays an important role in the plot.

Notable people

 Jean-Marie Bigard, French stand-up comedian, writer, and director
 Saint Marguerite Bourgeoys, (1620–1700), a founder of Congregation of Notre Dame of Montreal and the city of Montreal
 Gilles Buck (1935–2010), French sailor who competed in the 1968 Summer Olympics.
 Émile Coué (1857–1926), pharmacist, hypnotist, and creator of La méthode Coué ("Every day, in every way, I'm getting better and better")
 Hughes de Payens (1070–1136), Knight of the First Crusade and founder of the Knights Templar
 Chrétien de Troyes, 12th-century trouvère
 François Girardon (1628–1715), sculptor
 Linard Gonthier (1565 – after 1642), stained-glass artisan (verrier)
 François-Pierre Goy (born 1960), musicologist
 Édouard Herriot (1872–1957), Radical politician of the Third Republic, three-time Prime Minister of France
 André Lefèvre (1717–1768), contributor to the Encyclopédie
 Maurice Marinot (1882–1960), glass artist, painter
 Pierre Mignard (1610–1695), painter
 Jacques Pantaléon, (c. 1195–1264), Pope Urban IV
 Patroclus of Troyes (3rd century), martyr
 Pierre Pithou (1539–1596), Calvinist jurisconsult and scholar, co-editor of the Satire Ménippée
 Rashi (1040–1105), biblical and Talmudic commentator
 Rabbeinu Tam (1100–1171), rabbi and Rashi's grandson
 Maxime Rouyer, CFL linebacker for the Edmonton Eskimos.
 Béatrice Saubin (1959–2007), first foreign national to be sentenced to death in Malaysia for drug smuggling
 Hervé Schreiner (born 1974), former professional footballer
 Djibril Sidibé, footballer
 Nicolas Siret (1663–1754), composer
 Abdou Sissoko, footballer
 Gaëtane Thiney (1985), footballer and team captain of Paris FC (women), current member of France women's national football team, Cyprus Cup winner: 2012, 2014, 2017 SheBelieves Cup champion, UEFA Women's Under-19 Championship: 2003, an all-star team member of the UEFA Women's Championship All-Star Team: 2013, two-time winner player of the year
 Jean Tirole, Nobel Award in Economics
Aldebrandin of Siena, physician

Twin towns

Troyes is twinned with:

 Alkmaar, Netherlands
 Chesterfield, England
 Tournai, Belgium
 Darmstadt, Germany, since 1958
 Zielona Góra, Poland, since 1970
 Brescia, Italy, since 2016

See also
 Communes of the Aube department
 Count of Troyes
 Order of the Knights Templar
 Troy weight#Etymology
Scottish Women's Hospitals for Foreign Service

References

Bibliography

External links

 
 Troyes city council website

 
Communes of Aube
Prefectures in France
Burial sites of the House of Champagne
Gallia Lugdunensis
Champagne (province)
Aube communes articles needing translation from French Wikipedia